Paso Robles Wine Country is an American Viticultural Area located in the San Luis Obispo County, California. It has approximately 33,000 vineyard acres planted with wine grapes, and is well known for its heritage varietal Zinfandel, Cabernet Sauvignon, and Rhône-style wines.

History 
Grapes were first introduced into the Paso Robles area in 1787 by missionaries at Mission San Miguel Arcangel, where more than one thousand vines were planted.  Commercial wine growing, however, wasn't started until the 1880s with the establishment of Ascension Winery, later known as York Mountain Winery, and today known as Epoch Estate Wines. Among the winery’s early producers following prohibition was Polish pianist and composer Ignacy Jan Paderewski.

Since 1990, when there were fewer than 20 wineries in Paso Robles, a large expansion of activity has seen the number rise to more than 200 wineries today. Wine critic Robert M. Parker, Jr. commented on the region's promise of quality of wine, emphasizing the wineries L'Aventure, Linne Calodo, Saxum Vineyards, Doce Robles "Twelve Oaks" Winery & Vineyard, Villa Creek Cellars, Castoro Cellars and Tablas Creek Vineyard as the "leading Paso pioneers".

In 2007, a proposal to split the area at the Salinas River and form a new "Paso Robles Westside AVA" was made. The proposal was withdrawn in 2009, and a new proposal was made to break up the AVA into 11 smaller viticultural areas.

In 2014, The United States Alcohol and Tobacco Tax and Trade Bureau issued a final rule in the Federal Register establishing 11 new American viticultural areas within the existing Paso Robles viticultural area.

Paso Robles viticultural areas 

Adelaida District AVA
Creston District AVA
El Pomar District AVA
Paso Robles Estrella District AVA
Paso Robles Geneseo District AVA
Paso Robles Highlands District AVA
Paso Robles Willow Creek District AVA
San Juan Creek AVA
San Miguel District AVA
Santa Margarita Ranch AVA
Templeton Gap District AVA

Viticulture 

The Paso Robles AVA is still acknowledged for its heritage grape, Zinfandel, but has gained recognition from a wider range of grape varietals as well. In the 1950s and 1960s, growers began to plant Bordeaux varieties, particularly Cabernet Sauvignon, in the area. Starting in the 1980s, there have been increased plantings of many Rhône varieties, including the first Syrah planted in California, as well as Viognier and Roussanne to name a few. The emerging popularity of the region's wines led it to become the first site of the bi-annual "Hospice du Rhône" conference on Rhône style wine. Today, Paso Robles Wine Country is receiving attention for its unique Paso blends. These wines are unique to the area, and with varietal make-ups that do not follow traditional rules and expectations of winemaking, as characteristic in other regions of the wine world.

Wine Festivals

The Paso Robles Zinfandel Festival, now known as Vintage Paso: Zinfandel Weekend, is a festival focused on the Paso Robles area's heritage grape, Zinfandel. This event is held by the Paso Robles Wine Country Alliance, a non-profit cooperative marketing alliance. 

The Paso Robles Wine Festival is a festival focused on the wide variety of wines the area produces, held in Paso Robles' downtown city park. Attendees have the opportunity to talk with the Paso Robles vintners and taste their wines.

The Harvest Wine Weekend is a celebration of the harvest season with three days of hands-on Paso Robles Wine Country activities.

In 2015, the Paso Robles Wine Country Alliance started a new festival, BlendFest on the Coast, dedicated to the unique wine blends of Paso Robles, held on the coast in San Simeon and Cambria.

Awards 

 Wine Spectator #1 Wine in the World 2010: Saxum
 Wine Enthusiast Magazine 2013 Wine Region of the Year
 Sunset Magazine 2016 Best Wine Country Town

References

External links 
 Paso Robles Wine Country Alliance
 US laws for labelling wine

American Viticultural Areas of California
Paso Robles Aa
Geography of San Luis Obispo County, California
American Viticultural Areas
1983 establishments in California